Gracilipurpura is a genus of sea snails, marine gastropod mollusks in the subfamily Fusininae of the family Fasciolariidae, the spindle snails, the tulip snails and their allies.

Species
Species within the genus Gracilipurpura include:
 † Gracilipurpura acuticostata (Speyer, 1860) 
 † Gracilipurpura affinis (Bronn, 1831) 
 † Gracilipurpura austriaca (Hoernes & Auinger, 1890) 
 † Gracilipurpura cincta (Bellardi & Michelotti, 1840) 
 Gracilipurpura neogenica (Cossmann, 1901)
 † Gracilipurpura raouli (Lozouet, 2015) 
 Gracilipurpura rostrata (Olivi, 1792)

References

 Ceulemans L., Landau B.M. & Van Dingenen F. (2014). Carinofusus gen. nov. from the Mio-Pliocene transition of western France. Vita Malacologica. 12: 23–30.

External links
 Jousseaume, F. P. (1880). Division méthodique de la famille des Purpuridés. Le Naturaliste. 2(42): 335-338
 Monterosato T. A. (di) (1884). Nomenclatura generica e specifica di alcune conchiglie mediterranee. Palermo, Virzi, 152 pp

 
Gastropod genera